Upper Peirce Reservoir Park is a 5 hectares park besides Upper Peirce Reservoir.  It was opened by the then Prime Minister Lee Kuan Yew on 27 February 1977.

References

External links
National Parks Board website

Parks in Singapore